Guluronic acid is a uronic acid monosaccharide that may be derived from gulose. -Guluronic acid is a C-3 epimer of -galacturonic acid and a C-5 epimer of -mannuronic acid. Along with -mannuronic acid, -guluronic acid is a component of alginic acid, a polysaccharide found in brown algae. α-L-Guluronic acid has been found to bind divalent metal ions (such as calcium and strontium) through the carboxylate moiety and through the axial-equatorial-axial arrangement of hydroxyl groups found around the ring.

References 

Uronic acids